Arctella is a monotypic genus of cribellate araneomorph spiders in the family Dictynidae containing the single species, Arctella lapponica. It was first described by Å. Holm in 1945, and has only been found in Russia, Scandinavia, Mongolia, the United States, and Canada.

References

Dictynidae
Monotypic Araneomorphae genera
Spiders of Asia
Spiders of North America